Asociación Escuelas Lincoln is an international school located in La Lucila, a residential neighborhood in the Vicente López Partido district north of the city of Buenos Aires, Argentina. The school has class sizes of 15–22 students and is the only US-accredited school in Argentina. Many of its students have parents that work for embassies or international companies.

Curriculum
The curriculum is based on American and International School systems and all students earn a North American-Accredited Diploma . Students are also able to acquire the Argentinian diploma. The school also offers classes in the International Baccalaureate.

Sports
The school's mascot is the Condor. The school is a member and the creator of SAAC (South American Activities Conference), in which it takes part in football (soccer), basketball, volleyball, swimming and the more recently created SAAC Fine Arts.

Lincoln clubs and organizations
 Football
 Volleyball
 Swimming
 Tennis
 Ultimate Frisbee
 Basketball
 Lincoln Lens
 Biology, Chemistry and Physics Labs
 Art Club
 Chess Club
 Community Service Club
 Global Issues Network
 Prom Committee
 Organic Gardening Club
 National Honor Society
 Model United Nations
 Student Government
 String Music Ensemble 
 Ultimate Frisbee Club
 Yoga Club
 Engineering Club
 GSA (Gender and Sexuality Alliance)
 Rugby 
 TED-Ed
 TEDx
 ICIDo (I see, therefore I do)
 Girl UP
 Debate Club

See also

 Americans in Argentina

External links 
 School website

International schools in Greater Buenos Aires
Secondary schools in Argentina
Private schools in Argentina
Association of American Schools in South America
Educational institutions established in 1936
1936 establishments in Argentina